Wan'an station is a station on Xijiao line (light rail) of the Beijing Subway. It was opened on 30 December 2017.

Station Layout 
The station has 2 at-grade side platforms.

References 

Beijing Subway stations in Haidian District
Railway stations in China opened in 2017